Marius Leonavičius (born August 18, 1984 in Prienai, Lithuania) is a Lithuanian basketball coach. Currently he is serving as head coach of U18 and assistant coach of U21 for JL Bourg proffesional basketball club in France.

Coaching career 
After graduating from Lithuanian Sports University (Lithuanian Academy of Physical Education at the time) Leonavičius started his coaching career in Dublin, Ireland coaching for a local basketball club Tolka Rovers. In 2012, he became an assistant coach for the Trinity College Dublin men's basketball team. Several months later he was appointed as the head men's basketball coach.

In 2013, Leonavičius returned home to Lithuania and started coaching in his hometown of Prienai. He was the head coach of U18 and U16 boys basketball teams.

Lithuanian basketball league 

At the beginning of the 2014-15 season, Leonavičius was signed as an assistant coach for the Labas Gas (BC Prienai at the time) of the Lithuanian Basketball League. During his tenure as an assistant, Leonavičius coached under legendary Lithuanian coach Virginijus Šeškus and Mantas Šernius, who was named Lithuanian Basketball League's Coach of the year in his final season in 2021. At the start of the 2021-22 season, after serving as an assistant coach for 7 seasons, Leonavičius was signed as the head coach for the Labas Gas.

During the 2021-22 season, the Labas Gas competed in King Mindaugas Cup and won 4 games out of 8, however, it was not enough to qualify to the next stage of the competition. In the Lithuanian Basketball League the team started the season with 0-10 and in late November the club management decided to make a coaching change, offering Leonavičius the opportunity to stay on as an assistant coach. According to the club, they were happy with the coaching performance but "due to pressure from the sponsors and fans" had to make a change. The club was not able to find a replacement for Leonavičius immediately thus his assistant coach, Vidas Ginevičius, took over as the new head coach of Labas Gas. Leonavičius, however, due to "unclear vision of the club and it's future" decided to part ways and not to remain with the organization.

The Ball brothers and Lavar Ball 

During the 2017-18 season, BC Vytautas signed LiAngelo and LaMelo, brothers of National Basketball Association (NBA) player Lonzo Ball. Leonavičius and the BC Vytautas team since then was part of the Ball in the Family reality show featuring LaVar Ball, the worldwide known media personality and businessman.
During the 2020 NBA draft LaMelo Ball was selected with the 3rd overal pick by the Charlotte Hornets. His brother LiAngelo was also signed with NBA team the Detroit Pistons, however he was released a week later.

Since entering the NBA Lamelo Ball was named NBA Rookie of the Year (2021) and NBA All-Star (2022).

References 

Living people
Lithuanian basketball coaches
1984 births